Anne Helin (born 28 January 1987) is a Finnish retired ice hockey player and former member of the Finnish national ice hockey team. Representing Finland, she won a bronze medal in the women's ice hockey tournament at the 2010 Winter Olympics in Vancouver, three IIHF Women's World Championship bronze medals at the tournaments in 2008, 2009, and 2011, and a silver medal in the women's ice hockey tournament at the 2011 Winter Universiade in Erzurum, Turkey.

Playing career
Helin debuted in the Naisten SM-sarja, the Finnish Championship league for women's ice hockey, at age 12 in the 1999–2000 season. She played with the women's representative team of Karhu-Kissat (K-Kissat) during 1999 to 2002 and was the team's regular season leading scorer in 2000–01 and 2001–02. K-Kissat faced relegation in every season that Helin was with the team and, though Helin averaged over two points per game in the 2001 and 2002 qualification series, they were officially relegated in 2002.

To continue playing in the top-tier Naisten SM-sarja, Helin transferred to Itä-Helsingin Kiekko (IHK), another Helsinki-based club, for the 2002–03 season.

Career statistics

Regular season and playoffs 

Note: Postseason results in italics are from the qualification series rather than the playoffs and are not calculated with playoff totals.

International

See also
 List of Olympic women's ice hockey players for Finland

References

External links
 
 
 
 
 Anne Helin's profile, from http://www.vancouver2010.com; retrieved 2010-02-25.

1987 births
Living people
Competitors at the 2011 Winter Universiade
Finnish women's ice hockey forwards
Ice hockey people from Helsinki
Ice hockey players at the 2010 Winter Olympics
IHK Naiset players
Medalists at the 2010 Winter Olympics
Naisten Liiga All-Stars
Olympic bronze medalists for Finland
Olympic ice hockey players of Finland
Olympic medalists in ice hockey
Oulun Kärpät Naiset players
Universiade medalists in ice hockey
Universiade silver medalists for Finland